Rafael Matos and Felipe Meligeni Alves were the defending champions but chose not to defend their title.

Alexander Erler and Lucas Miedler won the title after defeating Dustin Brown and Julian Lenz 6–1, 7–6(7–3) in the final.

Seeds

Draw

References

External links
 Main draw

Città di Como Challenger - Doubles
2022 Doubles